Eden Ramblers was a rugby league club in Auckland which played in the Auckland Rugby League competition from 1911 to 1913.

Club History

Formation
On 11 April the New Zealand Herald reported that there was "every probability of a club forming in Avondale" and the league would send officials on the night of the 12th to meet with interested parties. The club was formed on the evening of 26 April at a meeting in the Avondale Public Hall. Mr. John Bollard, M.P. (president of the club) presided over the meeting. It was decided to name the club the Eden Ramblers Football Club with their colours to be green and gold. The following were elected to their first board:- Hon. Secretary, Mr. B. Noone; management committee, Messrs W.A. Cummings, J Eddowes, W. Fairweather, M. Morrow, and J. Denyer. With the addition of “several new members” the total club membership was “close to 50”. They had already begun to organise a practice match at Victoria Park with the Ponsonby United club.

Contrary to their name they were not based near Mt Eden or Eden Park. Their first ever meeting was in Avondale and they practised and played some matches also in Avondale. However all of their weekly meetings and social gatherings were at the Point Chevalier Hall meaning they were more based in the western suburbs. One possible explanation for their choice of name was that their first club president, M.P. John Bollard was the M.P. for the Eden Electorate which Avondale was a part of.

First season
They immediately entered a team in the first grade competition and joined Auckland Rugby League foundation clubs Ponsonby United, City Rovers, North Shore Albions, and Newton Rangers. They also held their early practises at the Avondale Racecourse. They held a practice match with Ponsonby on the Avondale Racecourse on 13 May. They had a bye in the first round and so played an A and B match at the racecourse in order to select a “junior team”. They then entered a team in the third grade as well as their senior side in A grade. The results for the third grade were only partially reported. The side had 2 wins and 3 losses reported.

The Eden Ramblers first playing squad was Mew, Bert Denyer, John Denyer, Noone, Bob (Robert) Biggs, Prosser, W. Fairweather, Morrow, Don Kenealy, Ray, Brett, J Cummings, A. Walker, Harris (2), O. Patterson, and R. McGowan. Their first ever official match was played against Ponsonby United at Victoria Park on 27 May. They were defeated 49 points to 10. Their first ever win, which was their only one of the season was against Newton Rangers on 22 July at the Auckland Domain. They won the match 14 to 5 with Don Kenealy scoring a try, Harris 2, Fairweather 1, and Kenealy kicking a penalty.

J. Cummings became their first representative player when he was selected in the forwards to play for Auckland against New Zealand on 10 June.

During the season they held a dance at Avondale, and another at Point Chevalier. They had also rented out the Point Chevalier Hall for two nights a week for eight months. They were to hold their 1912 annual concert there as well.

The 1912 season also saw they field a third grade team once again. Of their reported matches they won 3 and lost 3 and finished mid table. Eden also fielded a fourth grade side which was reported to have won 1 game and lost 3 with a handful of other scores not reported. Then in 1913 they fielded two sides in the third grade and one in the fourth grade.

Exit
The team struggled and ultimately folded in 1913. On 5 April 1919 the Auckland Star reported that a "new club that has just been affiliated is the Eden Ramblers, boys from Avondale and Point Chevalier". The new team however was not to become known as the Eden Ramblers but in fact were named Point Chevalier.

Playing record
In 1911 they played 7 matches with 1 win and 6 losses leaving them in last place. The 1912 season saw Eden record a 2 win, 1 draw, 8 loss record. Both of their wins were against City Rovers (10-6 and 25-5). While their draw was against Ponsonby. They also entered a team in the 3rd grade competition where they won 3 and lost three to finish 4th out of 7 teams. During the 1912 season Don Kenealy was selected to play for New Zealand on their tour of Australia. He played 4 matches for them on the wing. He also played 4 times for Auckland scoring a try against Lower Waikato. While halfback Bob Biggs was their only other Auckland representative for the season playing in the same match. Eden also fielded teams in the third grade and fourth grade. In 1913 they only lasted 5 games in the first grade competition before being unable to field a team. Their lone win in a 1 win, 4 loss season was against Manukau.

They finished their two and a half seasons with a 4 win, 1 draw, 18 loss record in the first grade. The club did not field any teams beyond the end of the 1913 season.

Myers Cup (first grade championship)

All time top point scorers (1911-1913)
The point scoring lists are compiled from matches played in the first grade championship.

Representative players

New Zealand

Auckland 
 J. Cummings 1911 (1)
 Don Kenealy 1911-13 (8)
 Bob (Robert) Biggs 1912 (1)

References

Auckland rugby league clubs
1911 establishments in New Zealand
Rugby clubs established in 1911
Sports clubs disestablished in 1913